Samuel George Curry  (Port Hope 1854 — 1942) was a Canadian architect who practiced in Toronto as the junior partner of several of Toronto’s leading architects, among them Frank Darling and from 1892 Darling's partner John A. Pearson, Henry Sproatt, Francis S. Baker, Ernest Rolph and W. F. Sparling.

In 1880, in partnership with Frank Darling (architect), he designed the first-place entry for the new Provincial Parliament Buildings in Toronto; through delay and politicking the design was not executed. Darling and Curry designed the former Bank of Montreal building at the corner of Yonge and Front streets (now housing the Hockey Hall of Fame) and the Victoria Hospital for Sick Children, on College Street, Toronto.

Curry, who was a member of the Toronto Architectural Guild also worked on his own, designing the John McKay Store (1898) formerly located 36 King Street West and in the 1980s relocated at 11 Adelaide Street West, to form part of Scotia Plaza. The structure is an example of Renaissance Revival style and incorporates architectural terracotta details.

Curry is also associated with a few other firms, with Francis Spence Baker as Curry and Baker, from 1895 to 1897, with William Frederick Sparling as Curry and Sparling 1909 to 1917 and on his own 1898 to 1904 and in from the 1920s to his retirement.

Curry was a member of the Royal Canadian Academy of Arts.

From 1902 to 1903 Curry was the Toronto City Alderman.

Curry died in 1942 in Toronto.

Works

References

Canadian architects
1854 births
1942 deaths
Members of the Royal Canadian Academy of Arts
People from Northumberland County, Ontario
Toronto city councillors